Ann Newdigate (born 1934) is a South African-born Canadian fibre artist working in tapestries.

She was born in Grahamstown and received a BA in African Studies and English Literature from the University of Cape Town. Newdigate came to Canada in 1966. She received a BFA and a MFA from the University of Saskatchewan. She pursued post-graduate studies in tapestry at the Edinburgh College of Art. From 1982 to 1987, she taught drawing, design and art education at the University of Saskatchewan. She also taught drawing and initiated the tapestry course in the fine arts program at Monash University as a visiting fellow. From 1992 to 1995, Newdigate served on the Saskatchewan Arts Board. She lives on Hornby Island in British Columbia.

She contributed the essay "Kinda art, sorta tapestry" to the anthology New feminist art criticism: critical strategies.

Her 1984 tapestry Creatures of Habit, purchased by the Government of Canada, was mistakenly placed in the lost and found at Montréal–Mirabel International Airport and sold at auction.

She was married to John Aitken Mills, who died in 2012.

Her art has appeared in exhibitions across Canada and in the United States and Australia. Her work is included in the collections of the Canada Council Art Bank, the Canadian Museum of History, the MacKenzie Art Gallery in Regina, the city of Regina, the city of Ottawa and the Toronto Dominion Bank in Edmonton.

References

External links 
 

1934 births
Living people
Canadian textile artists
Women textile artists
University of Cape Town alumni
University of Saskatchewan alumni
Academic staff of the University of Saskatchewan